Eamon Farren (born 19 May 1985) is an Australian actor. Following starring roles in the films X: Night of Vengeance (2011) and Chained (2012), he came to prominence for portraying Richard Horne in the 2017 revival of Twin Peaks. He also won the Australian Academy of Cinema and Television Arts (AACTA) award for Best Guest Or Supporting Actor in a Television Drama in 2015 for his role in the television film Carlotta (2014). Farren has since had film roles in Winchester (2018) and appeared in the series The ABC Murders (2018) and The Witcher (2019–present).

Early life and education 

Farren was born in north Queensland and raised near the Gold Coast from the age of six. Farren always knew he wanted to be an actor: "I can't remember a time when I didn't watch a movie and think, 'That's what I want to do'... Growing up, people said you have to have a plan B. I never felt that, I always thought, nah, this is what I'm going to do." He attended Benowa State High School and studied in its French Immersion Program where students study typical subjects but receive at least half of their schooling in French. Farren graduated from the National Institute of Dramatic Art (NIDA) in 2007. He credits actors Daniel Day-Lewis and Gary Oldman as his primary influences and inspiration.

Career 
Farren began his career in the Showtime television film The Outsider, starring Naomi Watts and Tim Daly, in 2001, followed by a guest role in the Australian live action series, The Sleepover Club in 2002. He worked with several theatre companies in Australia, particularly the Sydney Theatre Company, the Griffin Theatre Company and the Belvoir Street Theatre. In 2007, he was cast as Cpl. John Powell in the HBO miniseries The Pacific.

Farren worked his way through all the visual arts in 2008, starring in The Man In The Attic with the Sydney Theatre Co., the film Lucky Country, and the Seven Network television series, All Saints. In 2012, he earned a starring role in Jennifer Lynch's film Chained, playing "Rabbit", a boy enslaved and raised by a serial killer played by Vincent D'Onofrio. Farren said, "... Shooting the film felt like second nature, the scenes would be focused but loose, incredibly tense but hilarious. I never had to say too much to her [Lynch], she would give me a look or whisper one word and I'd get it."

Farren's next major role was in the ABC TV tele-movie, Carlotta, playing Danny/Ava, a transgender mate of the main character, that earned him the AACTA Award in 2015 for Best Guest Or Supporting Actor in a Television Drama. Farren said of filming, "The whole thing was a highlight, but one of my favourite scenes to shoot was when Carol and Ava are on the way to buy hormones for the first time – corpsing never felt so right."

Farren's theatre career continued in 2014 with critically acclaimed roles as Edward Ridgeway in Switzerland and Elliott in Girl Asleep, which would be adapted to film and star Farren as a different character, Adam/Benoit Tremet, a year later.

Farren starred as Kirill in Sydney Theatre Co's The Present in 2015, reprising the role in 2017 for its Broadway production, which also starred Cate Blanchett in her Broadway debut.

Farren was cast as the character Richard Horne in the revival of the U.S. TV series Twin Peaks which aired in 2017.

Filmography

Film

Television

Awards and nominations 
2015Winner, Best Guest or Supporting Actor in a Television Drama - "Danny/Ava" Carlotta. Australian Academy of Cinema & Television Arts (AACTA).
Nominee, Best Actor in a Leading Role in a Mainstream Production - "Edward Ridgeway" Switzerland. Sydney Theatre Awards.
2010Runner up, Heath Ledger Scholarship, Australians In Film, 2010.

References

External links 
 

Living people
21st-century Australian male actors
AACTA Award winners
Australian male stage actors
Australian male film actors
Australian male television actors
Male actors from the Gold Coast, Queensland
1985 births